MileHiCon  is an annual science fiction/fantasy convention held in Denver, Colorado in October. It is primarily literary, although it also has an art show, vendors' room, the Critter Crunch (similar to Robot Wars), the Critter Float-illa (robotic competition in the hotel pool), a video room, anime room, masquerade, gaming, bat'leth tournament, and programming on science, writing, literary, media and fannish topics. It runs its own track of kid-friendly, interactive programming and also hosts the Avistrum Academy of Sorcery. It is run by MileHiCon, Inc., a Colorado not-for-profit corporation, and donates money each year to local literacy programs.

History
MileHiCon was started by the Denver Area Science Fiction Association (DASFA). Following the monthly meeting in September 1969, several DASFAns discussed their recent experiences at the St. Louis WorldCon and it was decided to hold an SF (science fiction) Mini-Convention for the next meeting. However, due to some planning hitches and the inability of some key people to attend, it was postponed until November.

The name of the evening-long event was shortened to Minicon. It was held in the basement meeting room of the Columbia Savings Bank, where DASFA met at that time. DASFA soon discovered that another convention called Minicon had been started the previous year in Minneapolis. Since that name was taken, DASFA decided to rename it Octocon, since (after the first one) it was held in October. After a couple of years holding Octocon, they discovered there was a convention in Ireland called Octocon. DASFA then renamed the convention again. Two final proposals for the title were:
 "MileHiCon," which plays off Denver being "the Mile-High City", and would be unlikely to be duplicated;
 "LungfishGranolaCon," which refers to an ancient DASFA tradition of lungfish jokes, a type of word game.
"MileHiCon" was chosen, after a close vote.

Around 1980, MileHiCon was incorporated as an entity separate from DASFA (which still meets, but is not incorporated). For the last several years, attendance has generally hovered around a thousand.

MileHiCon 43 was held 21–23 October 2011. Guests included authors Vernor Vinge and Glen Cook, and editor Gardner Dozois with artist guest Theresa Mather. Denver author Mario Acevedo was the toastmaster.

MileHiCon 44 was held 19–21 October 2012. Guests included authors Cherie Priest and C. J. Henderson, with artist guest Stephen Hickman. Colorado author Stephen Graham Jones was the toastmaster.

MileHiCon 45 was held 18–20 October 2013. Guests included authors Seanan McGuire and Catherynne Valente, and artist Aaron B. Miller. New Mexico author Ian Tregillis was the toastmaster.

MileHiCon 46 was held 24–26 October 2014. Guests included authors Daniel Abraham and Ty Franck (who also write together as James S. A. Corey) and Michael Swanwick. Artist guests were Phil Foglio and Kaja Foglio. Denver author Jeanne C. Stein was the toastmaster.

MileHiCon 47 was held 23–25 October 2015. Guests included authors Kevin Hearne and Kristine Kathryn Rusch. Artist guest was Ursula Vernon. James Van Pelt was the toastmaster.

MileHiCon 48 Was held 28–30 October 2016. Guests included authors John Varley and Kelley Armstrong. Artist guest was Julie Dillon. Chaz Kemp was the toastmaster.

MileHiCon 49 was 28–30 October 2017. Guests included authors Eric Flint and Jane Lindskold. Artist guest was Carrie Ann Baade. Author Jason Heller was the toastmaster.

MileHiCon 50 was 19-21 October 2018. All past guests of honor have been invited back for the semi-centennial celebration.

MileHiCon 51 is scheduled for 18-20 October 2019. Guest include authors Angela Roquet and Marie Brennan. Artist guest is Elizabeth Leggett. Author Carol Berg is the toastmaster.

References

Science fiction conventions in the United States
Festivals in Denver
Organizations based in Denver
Recurring events established in 1969
Fantasy conventions
Tourist attractions in Denver
1969 establishments in Colorado